Chandrika Gururaj (born 4 October 1959), is an Indian playback singer, known for her works in Kannada. Apart from film songs, she has also recorded numerous devotional, bhaavageethe and folk songs. For her song "O Priyatama" in the movie Urvashi, Chandrika won the Karnataka State Film Award for Best Female Playback Singer in 1994. Karnataka Government honoured her with the Karnataka Rajyotsava Award for her contribution to music, in 2010.

Kannada
All songs are in Kannada

References

Gururaj, Chandrika